Derbyshire County Cricket Club in 1897 was the cricket season when the English club Derbyshire had been playing for twenty-six years. It was their third season in the County Championship and they came fourteenth after failing to win a match, though they were exceptionally unlucky in losing by a single wicket to power clubs Lancashire and Yorkshire and being robbed by time of victory over Leicestershire late in the season.

1897 season
Derbyshire played sixteen games in the County Championship and one against MCC. They did not win a match in the season, losing ten. They were missing two key bowlers: John Hulme, who had taken most wickets in 1896, did not play at all during the season; and George Porter, who underwent surgery in 1896 and retired from the game.

Sydney Evershed was in his seventh season as captain. Levi Wright was top scorer, overtaking Bagshaw's lead in the Championship with a good performance against MCC. George Davidson took most wickets but, apart from three matches on sticky wickets against Lancashire, Warwickshire and Yorkshire, was never difficult, and of the others only wicket-keeper Storer ever took five wickets in one innings.

Of those who made their debuts in the season, Arnold Warren went on to play for the club for 23 years and represented England in 1905, and Maynard Ashcroft, a doctor, went on to become club captain. Most of the remaining newcomers were from mining families. Frank Davidson, Joseph Hancock and William Wilmot each played over several more seasons but more or less occasionally. James Cross, Herbert Bostock, Dick Steeples and Edward Houseman all appeared only in the 1897 season, Cross playing nine matches, Bostock four, Steeples three and Houseman one. Cross and Steeples filled in for the lack of bowling, while Bostock achieved a high average in his three games.

Matches
{| class="wikitable" width="100%"
! bgcolor="#efefef" colspan=6 | List of  matches
|- bgcolor="#efefef"
!No.
!Date
!V
!Result 
!Margin
!Notes
|-
|1
|10 May 1897
|LancashireCounty Ground, Derby 
|bgcolor="#FF0000"|Lost
| Innings and 220 runs
| Ward 162; Mold 6-55 and 6-29
|-
|2
|24 May 1897
|Surrey<small>Kennington Oval 
|bgcolor="#FF0000"|Lost
| Innings and 3 runs
| H Bagshaw 114; W Storer  5-40; Richardson 5-82
|-
|3
|31 May 1897
|WarwickshireCounty Ground, Derby 
|bgcolor="#FFCC00"|Drawn
| 
|G Davidson 6-62 
|-
|4
|03 Jun 1897
|LancashireAigburth, Liverpool   
|bgcolor="#FF0000"|Lost
| 1 wicket
| Briggs 8-70; G Davidson 6-22 
|-
|5
|07 Jun 1897
|HampshireCounty Ground, Southampton 
|bgcolor="#FFCC00"|Drawn
| 
| Lacey 121; H Bagshaw 105 
|-
|6
|10 Jun 1897
|MCC<small>Lord's Cricket Ground, St John's Wood 
|bgcolor="#FF0000"|Lost
| 2 wickets
| Trott 6-47; Mead 5-67 
|-
|7
|14 Jun 1897
|Yorkshire<small>County Ground, Derby 
|bgcolor="#FF0000"|Lost
| 1 wicket
| W Storer  104; Peel 5-47
|-
|8
|28 Jun 1897
|Essex <small>County Ground, Leyton 
|bgcolor="#FF0000"|Lost
| 7 wickets
| W Chatterton 120; Bull 7-93 and 6-63
|-
|9
| 05 Jul 1897
|NottinghamshireCounty Ground, Derby
|bgcolor="#FFCC00"|Drawn
| 
| Gunn 152;
|-
|10
|19 Jul 1897
|EssexCounty Ground, Derby 
|bgcolor="#FFCC00"|Drawn
| 
| SH Evershed 112; Bull 6-137
|-
|11
|22 Jul 1897
|Leicestershire<small>Grace Road, Leicester 
|bgcolor="#FF0000"|Lost
| 5 wickets
| Stocks 5-49; Woodcock 5-106 
|-
|12
|26 Jul 1897
|SurreyCounty Ground, Derby
|bgcolor="#FF0000"|Lost
| 10 wickets
| Key 130; Richardson 6-52; Lees 5-63
|-
|13
|02 Aug 1897
|HampshireCounty Ground, Derby   
|bgcolor="#FF0000"|Lost
| 186 runs
| 
|-
|14
|09 Aug 1897 
|NottinghamshireTrent Bridge, Nottingham 
|bgcolor="#FFCC00"|Drawn
| 
| Gunn 230; LG Wright 133; G Davidson 121 
|-
|15
|16 Aug 1897
|LeicestershireCounty Ground, Derby 
|bgcolor="#FFCC00"|Drawn
| 
| H Bagshaw 124
|-
|16
|19 Aug 1897
|Yorkshire Park Avenue Cricket Ground, Bradford
|bgcolor="#FF0000"|Lost
| 5 wickets
| Haigh 6-18 and 5-62; G Davidson 6-23; Wainwright 5-39  
|-
|17
|30 Aug 1897
|Warwickshire<small>Edgbaston, Birmingham 
|bgcolor="#FFCC00"|Drawn
| 
| 
|-

Statistics

County Championship batting averages

(a) Figures adjusted for non Championship match

County Championship bowling averages

(a) Figures adjusted for non Championship match

Wicket Keeping
William Storer  Catches 26, Stumpings 2

See also
Derbyshire County Cricket Club seasons
1897 English cricket season

References

1897 in English cricket
Derbyshire County Cricket Club seasons
English cricket seasons in the 19th century